Zaisser is a surname. Notable people with the surname include:

Elisabeth Zaisser (1898–1987), German politician and Minister for People's Education in the East Germany
Wilhelm Zaisser (1893–1958), German politician and Minister for State Security in the East Germany

See also 
Zaiser